Pabstiella wanderbildtiana is a species of orchid plant native to Brazil.

References 

wanderbildtiana
Flora of Brazil